In human genetics, a human Y-chromosome DNA haplogroup is a haplogroup defined by mutations in the non-recombining portions of DNA from the male-specific Y chromosome (called Y-DNA). Many people within a haplogroup share similar numbers of short tandem repeats (STRs) and types of mutations called single-nucleotide polymorphisms (SNPs).

The human Y-chromosome accumulates roughly two mutations per generation. Y-DNA haplogroups represent major branches of the Y-chromosome phylogenetic tree that share hundreds or even thousands of mutations unique to each haplogroup.

The Y-chromosomal most recent common ancestor (Y-MRCA, informally known as Y-chromosomal Adam) is the most recent common ancestor (MRCA) from whom all currently living humans are descended patrilineally. Y-chromosomal Adam is estimated to have lived roughly 236,000 years ago in Africa. By examining other bottlenecks most Eurasian men (men from populations outside of Africa) are descended from a man who lived in Africa 69,000 years ago (Haplogroup CT). Other major bottlenecks occurred about 50,000 and 5,000 years ago and subsequently the ancestry of most Eurasian men can be traced back to four ancestors who lived 50,000 years ago, who were descendants of African (E-M168).

Naming convention

Y-DNA haplogroups are defined by the presence of a series of Y-DNA SNP markers. Subclades are defined by a terminal SNP, the SNP furthest down in the Y-chromosome phylogenetic tree. The Y Chromosome Consortium (YCC) developed a system of naming major Y-DNA haplogroups with the capital letters A through T, with further subclades named using numbers and lower case letters (YCC longhand nomenclature). YCC shorthand nomenclature names Y-DNA haplogroups and their subclades with the first letter of the major Y-DNA haplogroup followed by a dash and the name of the defining terminal SNP.

Y-DNA haplogroup nomenclature is changing over time to accommodate the increasing number of SNPs being discovered and tested, and the resulting expansion of the Y-chromosome phylogenetic tree. This change in nomenclature has resulted in inconsistent nomenclature being used in different sources. This inconsistency, and increasingly cumbersome longhand nomenclature, has prompted a move toward using the simpler shorthand nomenclature.

Phylogenetic structure
Phylogenetic tree of Y-DNA haplogroups

Major Y-DNA haplogroups

Haplogroups A and B 
Haplogroup A is the NRY (non-recombining Y) macrohaplogroup from which all modern paternal haplogroups descend. It is sparsely distributed in Africa, being concentrated among Khoisan populations in the southwest and Nilotic populations toward the northeast in the Nile Valley. BT is a subclade of haplogroup A, more precisely of the A1b clade (A2-T in Cruciani et al. 2011), as follows:
 Haplogroup A
 Haplogroup A00
 Haplogroup A0 (formerly also A1b)
 Haplogroup A1 (also A1a-T)
 Haplogroup A1a (M31)
 Haplogroup A1b (also A2-T; P108, V221)
 Haplogroup A1b1a1 (also A2; M14)
 Haplogroup A1b1b (also A3; M32)
 Haplogroup BT (M91, M42, M94, M139, M299)
 Haplogroup B (M60)
 Haplogroup CT

Haplogroup CT (P143) 

The defining mutations separating CT (all haplogroups except for A and B) are M168 and M294. The site of origin is likely in Africa. Its age has been estimated at approximately 88,000 years old, and more recently at around 100,000 or 101,000 years old.

Haplogroup C (M130)

 Haplogroup C (M130, M216) Found in Asia, Oceania, and North America
 Haplogroup C1 (F3393/Z1426)
 Haplogroup C1a (CTS11043)
 Haplogroup C1a1 (M8, M105, M131) Found with low frequency in Japan
 Haplogroup C1a2 (V20) Found with low frequency in Europe, Armenians, Algeria, and Nepal
 Haplogroup C1b (F1370, Z16480)
 Haplogroup C1b1 (AM00694/K281)
 Haplogroup C1b1a (B66/Z16458)
 Haplogroup C1b1a1 (M356) Found with low frequency in South Asia, Southwest Asia, and northern China
 Haplogroup C1b1a2 (B65)
 Haplogroup C1b1a2a (B67) Found among Lebbo' people in Borneo, Indonesia
 Haplogroup C1b1a2b (F725) Found among Han Chinese (Guangdong, Hunan, and Shaanxi), Dai people (Yunnan), Murut people (Brunei), Malay people (Singapore), and Aeta people (Philippines)
 Haplogroup C1b1a3 (Z16582) Found with low frequency in Saudi Arabia and Iraq
 Haplogroup C1b1b (B68) Found among Dusun people (Brunei)
 Haplogroup C1b2 (C-Z16582)
 Haplogroup C1b3 (B477/Z31885)
 Haplogroup C1b3a (M38) Found in Indonesia, New Guinea, Melanesia, Micronesia, and Polynesia
 Haplogroup C1b3b (M347, P309) Found among the indigenous peoples in Australia
 Haplogroup C2 (M217, P44) Found throughout Eurasia and North America, but especially among Mongols, Kazakhs, Tungusic peoples, Paleosiberians, and Na-Dené-speaking peoples

Haplogroup D (CTS3946)

 Haplogroup D (CTS3946)
 Haplogroup D1 (M174) Found in Japan, China (especially Tibet), the Andaman Islands 
 Haplogroup D1a (CTS11577)
 Haplogroup D1a1 (Z27276, Z27283, Z29263)
 Haplogroup D1a1a (M15) Found mainly in Tibetans, Qiangic peoples, Yi, and Hmong-Mien peoples
 Haplogroup D1a1b (P99) Found mainly in Tibetans, Qiangic peoples, Naxi, and Turkic peoples
 Haplogroup D1a2 (M55, M57, M64.1, M179, P12, P37.1, P41.1 (M359.1), 12f2.2) Found mainly in Japan
 Haplogroup D1a3 (Y34637) Found in Andamanese peoples (Onge, Jarawa)
 Haplogroup D1b (L1366, L1378, M226.2) Found in Mactan Island, Philippines
 Haplogroup D2 (A5580.2) Found in Nigeria, Saudi Arabia and Syria

Haplogroup E (M96)

 Haplogroup E (M40, M96) Found in Africa and parts of the Middle East and Europe
 Haplogroup E1 (P147)
 Haplogroup E1a (M33, M132) formerly E1
 Haplogroup E1b (P177)
 Haplogroup E1b1 (P2, DYS391p); formerly E3
 Haplogroup E1b1a (V38)
 Haplogroup E1b1a1 (M2) Found in Africa, especially among Niger–Congo-speaking populations.; formerly E3a
 Haplogroup E1b1a2 (M329) Found in Africa, especially in Ethiopia among Omotic-speaking populations.; formerly E3*
 Haplogroup E1b1b (M215)
 Haplogroup E1b1b1 (M35) Found in Horn of Africa, North Africa, the Middle East, and Europe (especially in areas near the Mediterranean and the Balkans); formerly E3b
 Haplogroup E2 (M75)

Haplogroup F (M89) 

The groups descending from haplogroup F are found in some 90% of the world's population, but almost exclusively outside of sub-Saharan Africa.

F xG,H,I,J,K is rare in modern populations and peaks in South Asia, especially Sri Lanka. It also appears to have long been present in South East Asia; it has been reported at rates of 4–5% in Sulawesi and Lembata. One study, which did not comprehensively screen for other subclades of F-M89 (including some subclades of GHIJK), found that Indonesian men with the SNP P14/PF2704 (which is equivalent to M89), comprise 1.8% of men in West Timor, 1.5% of Flores 5.4% of Lembata 2.3% of Sulawesi and 0.2% in Sumatra. F* (F xF1,F2,F3) has been reported among 10% of males in Sri Lanka and South India, 5% in Pakistan, as well as lower levels among the Tamang people (Nepal), and in Iran. F1 (P91),  F2 (M427) and F3 (M481; previously F5) are all highly rare and virtually exclusive to regions/ethnic minorities in Sri Lanka, India, Nepal, South China, Thailand, Burma, and Vietnam. In such cases, however, the possibility of misidentification is considered to be relatively high and some may belong to misidentified subclades of Haplogroup GHIJK.

Haplogroup G (M201) 

Haplogroup G (M201) originated some 48,000 years ago and its most recent common ancestor likely lived 26,000 years ago in the Middle East. It spread to Europe with the Neolithic Revolution.

It is found in many ethnic groups in Eurasia; most common in the Caucasus, Iran, Anatolia and the Levant.  Found in almost all European countries, but most common in Gagauzia, southeastern Romania, Greece, Italy, Spain, Portugal, Tyrol, and Bohemia with highest concentrations on some Mediterranean islands; uncommon in Northern Europe.

G-M201 is also found in small numbers in northwestern China and India, Bangladesh, Pakistan, Sri Lanka, Malaysia, and North Africa.
 Haplogroup G1
 Haplogroup G2
 Haplogroup G2a
 Haplogroup G2a1
 Haplogroup G2a2
 Haplogroup G2a3
 Haplogroup G2a3a
 Haplogroup G2a3b
 Haplogroup G2a3b1
 Haplogroup G2b
 Haplogroup G2c (formerly Haplogroup G5)
 Haplogroup G2c1

Haplogroup H (M69) 

Haplogroup H (M69) probably emerged in South Central Asia or South Asia, about 48,000 years BP, and remains largely prevalent there in the forms of H1 (M69) and H3 (Z5857). Its sub-clades are also found in lower frequencies in Iran, Central Asia, across the middle-east, and the Arabian peninsula.

However, H2 (P96) is present in Europe since the Neolithic and H1a1 (M82) spread westward in the Medieval era with the migration of the Roma people.

Haplogroup I (M170) 

Haplogroup I (M170, M258)  is found mainly in Europe and the Caucasus.
 Haplogroup I1 Nordid/Nordic Europids (M253) Found mainly in northern Europe
 Haplogroup I2 Dinarid/Dinaric Europids (P215) Found mainly in Balkans, southeast Europe and Sardinia save for I2B1 (m223) which is found at a moderate frequency in Western, Central, and Northern Europe.

Haplogroup J (M304) 

Haplogroup J (M304, S6, S34, S35) is found mainly in the Middle East and South-East Europe.
 Haplogroup J* (J-M304*) is rare outside the island of Socotra.
 Haplogroup J1 Semitid/Bedouinid Arabids (M267) are associated with Northeast Caucasian peoples in Dagestan and Semitic languages speaking people in the Middle East, Ethiopia, and North Africa and also found in Mediterranean Europe in smaller frequencies much like haplogroup T.
 Haplogroup J2 Syrid/Nahrainid Arabids (M172) is found mainly in the Semitic-speaking peoples, Anatolia, Greece, the Balkans, Italy, Iran, the Caucasus, South Asia, and Central Asia.

Haplogroup K (M9)

Haplogroup K (M9) is spread all over Eurasia, Oceania and among Native Americans.

K(xLT,K2a,K2b) – that is, K*, K2c, K2d or K2e – is found mainly in Melanesia, Aboriginal Australians, India, Polynesia and Island South East Asia.

Haplogroups L and T (K1)

Haplogroup L (M20) is found in South Asia, Central Asia, South-West Asia, and the Mediterranean.

Haplogroup T (M184, M70, M193, M272) is found at high levels in the Horn of Africa (mainly Cushitic-speaking peoples), parts of South Asia, the Middle East, and the Mediterranean. T-M184 is also found in significant minorities of Sciaccensi, Stilfser, Egyptians, Omanis, Sephardi Jews, Ibizans (Eivissencs), and Toubou. It is also found at low frequencies in other parts of the Mediterranean and South Asia.

Haplogroup K2 (K-M526) 

The only living males reported to carry the basal paragroup K2* are indigenous Australians. Major studies published in 2014 and 2015 suggest that up to 27% of Aboriginal Australian males carry K2*, while others carry a subclade of K2.

Haplogroups K2a, K2a1, NO & NO1

Haplogroup N 

Haplogroup N (M231) is found in northern Eurasia, especially among speakers of the Uralic languages.

Haplogroup N possibly originated in eastern Asia and spread both northward and westward into Siberia, being the most common group found in some Uralic-speaking peoples.

Haplogroup O 

Haplogroup O (M175) is found with its highest frequency in East Asia and Southeast Asia, with lower frequencies in the South Pacific, Central Asia, South Asia, and islands in the Indian Ocean (e.g. Madagascar, the Comoros).
 Haplogroup O1 (F265/M1354, CTS2866,  F75/M1297, F429/M1415, F465/M1422)
 Haplogroup O1a (M119, CTS31, F589/Page20, L246, L466) Found in eastern,central and southern Mainland China, Taiwan, and Southeast Asia, especially among Austronesian and Tai–Kadai peoples
 Haplogroup O1b (P31, M268)
 Haplogroup O1b1 (M95) Found in Japan, southern China, Taiwan, Southeast Asia, and the Indian subcontinent, especially among Austroasiatic- and Tai–Kadai-speaking peoples, Malays, and Indonesians
 Haplogroup O1b2 (SRY465, M176) Found in Japan, Korea, Manchuria, and Southeast Asia
 Haplogroup O2 (M122) Found throughout East Asia, Southeast Asia, and Austronesia including Polynesia

Haplogroups K2b1, M & S

No examples of the basal paragroup K2b1* have been identified. Males carrying subclades of K2b1 are found primarily among Papuan peoples, Micronesian peoples, indigenous Australians, and Polynesians.

Its primary subclades are two major haplogroups:
 Haplogroup S (B254) also known as K2b1a: found in the highlands of Papua New Guinea and;
 Haplogroup M (P256) also known as K2b1b: found in New Guinea and Melanesia.

Haplogroup P (K2b2)

Haplogroup P (P295) has two primary branches: P1 (P-M45) and the extremely rare P2 (P-B253).

P*, P1* and P2 are found together only on the island of Luzon in the Philippines. In particular, P* and P1* are found at significant rates among members of the Aeta (or Agta) people of Luzon. While, P1* is now more common among living individuals in Eastern Siberia and Central Asia, it is also found at low levels in mainland South East Asia and South Asia. Considered together, these distributions tend to suggest that P* emerged from K2b in South East Asia.

P1 is also the parent node of two primary clades:
 Haplogroup Q (Q-M242) and;
 Haplogroup R (R-M207). These share the common marker M45 in addition to at least 18 other SNPs.

Haplogroup Q (MEH2, M242, P36) found in Siberia and the Americas
Haplogroup R  (M207, M306): found in Europe, West Asia, Central Asia, and South Asia

Haplogroup Q M242

Q is defined by the SNP M242. It is believed to have arisen in Central Asia approximately 32,000 years ago. The subclades of Haplogroup Q with their defining mutation(s), according to the 2008 ISOGG tree are provided below. ss4 bp, rs41352448, is not represented in the ISOGG 2008 tree because it is a value for an STR. This low frequency value has been found as a novel Q lineage (Q5) in Indian populations

The 2008 ISOGG tree
 Q (M242)
 Q*
 Q1 (P36.2)
 Q1*
 Q1a (MEH2)
 Q1a*
 Q1a1 (M120, M265/N14) Found with low frequency among Bhutanese, Dungans, Han Chinese, Japanese, Koreans, Mongolians, Naxi, and Tibetans
 Q1a2 (M25, M143) Found at low to moderate frequency among some populations of Southwest Asia, Central Asia, and Siberia
 Q1a3 (M346)
 Q1a3* Found at low frequency in Pakistan, India, and Tibet
 Q1a3a (M3) Typical of indigenous peoples of the Americas
 Q1a3a*
 Q1a3a1 (M19) Found among some indigenous peoples of South America, such as the Ticuna and the Wayuu
 Q1a3a2 (M194)
 Q1a3a3 (M199, P106, P292)
 Q1a4 (P48)
 Q1a5 (P89)
 Q1a6 (M323) Found in a significant minority of Yemeni Jews
 Q1b (M378) Found at low frequency among samples of Hazara and Sindhis

Haplogroup R (M207)

Haplogroup R is defined by the SNP M207. The bulk of Haplogroup R is represented in the descendant subclade R1 (M173), which likely originated on the Eurasian Steppes. R1 has two descendant subclades: R1a and R1b.

R1a is associated with the proto-Indo-Iranian and Balto-Slavic peoples, and is now found primarily in Central Asia, South Asia, and Eastern Europe.

Haplogroup R1b is the dominant haplogroup of Western Europe and is also found sparsely distributed among various peoples of Asia and Africa. Its subclade R1b1a2 (M269) is the haplogroup that is most commonly found among modern Western European populations, and has been associated with the Italo-Celtic and Germanic peoples.
 Haplogroup R1 (M173) Found throughout western Eurasia
 Haplogroup R1a (M420) Found in Central Asia, South Asia, and Central, Northern and Eastern Europe, Balkans 
 Haplogroup R1b (M343) Found in Western Europe, West Asia, Central Asia, North Africa, and northern Cameroon
 Haplogroup R2 (M124) Found in South Asia, Caucasus, Central Asia, and Eastern Europe

Chronological development of haplogroups

See also
 List of Y-chromosome haplogroups in populations of the world
 Y-DNA haplogroups in populations of Europe
 Genetic history of Europe
 List of Y-DNA single-nucleotide polymorphisms
 List of Y-STR markers
 Human mitochondrial DNA haplogroup
 * (haplogroup)
 Molecular phylogeny
 Genetic genealogy
 Genealogical DNA test
 Conversion table for Y chromosome haplogroups

References 

  2005 Y-chromosome Phylogenetic Tree, from FamilyTreeDNA.com
  A Nomenclature system for the Tree of Human Y-Chromosomal Haplogroups, Genome.org

Further reading
 
  (chart highlighting new branches added to the A phylotree in March 2013)

External links

 ISOGG Y-DNA Haplogroup Tree
 Family Tree DNA Public Haplotree
 Chart of the speed of different Y chromosomal STR mutation rates
 Map of Y Haplogroups
 Atlas of the Human Journey, from the Genographic Project, National Geographic
 DNA Heritage's Y-haplogroup map
 Video tutorial on Discovering Paternal Ancestry with Y-Chromosomes
 Haplogroup Predictor
  As PDF Paper that defined "Eu" haplogroups
 Y-DNA Haplogroup and Sub-clade Projects
 Kerchner's YDNA Haplogroup Descriptions, Projects & Links
 Y-DNA Testing Company STR Marker Comparison Chart
 Y-DNA Ethnographic and Genographic Atlas and Open-Source Data Compilation
 Y Chromosome Consortium

Genetics-related lists